

The following lists events that happened during 1930 in Afghanistan.

During the first year of his reign, Nadir Shah scrupulously observes his constitutional obligations, though he retains almost absolute power in his own hands by appointing members of his family to the chief offices of state. At the same time he is careful not to offend the religious or tribal susceptibilities of his subjects. He rescinds the two reforms of King Amanullah which had most embittered the population - the suppression of the purdah and the secularizing of the law. He allows the influence of the mullahs to be restored, and creates a tribunal of ulemas in Kabul to interpret the Sharia (law of the Qur'an). He endeavours to placate the tribes by appointing governors from among their own leading men. As a result of these concessions, he is allowed to remain in peaceful occupation of the throne. A section of the Shinwaris shows a disposition to revolt early in the year, but they are suppressed by their own fellow tribesmen. Trouble continues for some time among the Kohistanis and Kohidamanis, the tribesmen of the amir Habibullah, but they are decisively defeated in July. The confidence inspired by the new regime leads to a revival of trade during the year, which is assisted by good harvests. An appeal addressed by the king to wealthy merchants to make voluntary contributions to the Treasury meets with considerable success. Telegraphic, telephonic, and wireless connections, both internally and with foreign countries, are re-established.
Muhammad Hashim Khan who was Prime Minister that time in 1930, who refused to join Afghanistan in newly created Muslim State named Pakistan, and by Officially he stated about the Pakistan, that This country is being used to deceive the Muslims by Punjabi Establishment of British India .

Incumbents
 Monarch – Mohammed Nadir Shah
 Prime Minister – Mohammad Hashim Khan

Early May
The Anglo-Afghan Treaty of Rawalpindi, concluded in 1921, is reaffirmed, and shortly afterwards the British minister to Afghanistan, Richard Maconachie, reaches Kabul. Nadir Shah maintains friendly relations both with Russia and with Britain.

End of 1930
When unrest breaks out among the Afridis and other tribes in the northwest of India, King Nadir successfully uses his influence among the tribesmen to dissuade them from joining in any incursions into Indian territory.

 
Afghanistan
Years of the 20th century in Afghanistan
Afghanistan